O-1057 is an analgesic cannabinoid derivative created by Organix Inc., Newburyport, Massachusetts, for use in scientific research. Unlike most cannabinoids discovered to date, it is water-soluble, which gives it considerable advantages over many related cannabinoids. It has moderate affinity for both CB1 and CB2 receptors, with Ki values of 8.36 nM at CB1 and 7.95 nM at CB2

See also
 AM-2232
 O-774
 O-1812
 O-2694
 SP-111

References

Cannabinoids
Benzochromenes
Carboxylate esters
4-Morpholinyl compunds
Nitriles